Ečs (81-709) is a type of Soviet metro rolling stock for Prague Metro that derives from the Metrowagonmash E series.

History 

85 cars were built by Metrowagonmash in Mytishchi near Moscow between 1972 and 1976. The first six cars were delivered in 1973 for test runs, further 44 until 1974, when the trains entered service, firstly as three car sets. 20 cars followed in 1975 which had no tachographs, train radio, or ARS safety system and were used to extend the existing sets to the length of four cars. The last 15 cars were delivered in 1976.

In 1992, car 1031 was sold to Siemens to be used as an experimental vehicle for 1500 V DC voltage, 560 kW power output and current collection via overhead wires. In 1994, car 1020 was withdrawn and planned to be rebuilt by ČKD in cooperation with Škoda. The project wasn't realised.

The remaining cars were withdrawn between 1994 and 1997.

Four of the 85 cars have been preserved, of which three (1083, 1084, 1085) are kept in Kačerov (C) depot for special occasions, and one (1009) is preserved in Prague transport museum MHD in Střešovice.

References

External links 

 Rolling stock Ečs at metroweb.cz – history, information and photos (Czech)

Train-related introductions in 1974
Electric multiple units of the Czech Republic